The 2015 Jacksonville Armada FC season was the club's first season of existence, they played in the North American Soccer League, the second tier of the American soccer pyramid.

Season Review
José Luis Villarreal was appointed as the club's first manager on June 11, 2014.

Villarreal announced he would be leaving Armada at the end of the Spring season on May 22, with Guillermo Ángel Hoyos replacing him as head coach. On June 30, Armada extended Head Coach Guillermo Ángel Hoyos' contract until the end of the 2019 season, before dismissing Hoyos on September 21 and placing Eric Dade as Interim Manager.

Media
All Armada NASL matches would be broadcast locally on television on WCWJ CW17 and on the radio on WFXJ "Sports Radio 930". The play-by-play announcer would be Cole Pepper, who is experienced doing sports announcing in the Jacksonville area, including 15 years with the Jacksonville Jaguars.

Armada matches can be streamed online via NASL's TV package with ESPN3, or iHeart Radio.

Roster

Staff

Transfers

Winter
Note: Flags indicate national team as has been defined under FIFA eligibility rules. Players may hold more than one non-FIFA nationality.

In:

Out:

Summer
Note: Flags indicate national team as has been defined under FIFA eligibility rules. Players may hold more than one non-FIFA nationality.

In:

Out:

Friendlies

Competitions

NASL Spring season

Standings

Results summary

Results by round

Results

NASL Fall season

Standings

Results summary

Results by round

Results

U.S. Open Cup

Squad statistics

Appearances and goals

|-
|colspan="14"|Players who appeared for Jacksonville Armada who left the club during the season:
|}

Goal scorers

Disciplinary record

References

External links
 

Jacksonville Armada FC seasons
American soccer clubs 2015 season
2015 North American Soccer League season
2015 in sports in Florida